Acaulimalva is a genus of plants in the family Malvaceae. It contains 21 species that are found in South America.

Species

 Acaulimalva acaulis (Dombey ex Cav.) Krapov.
 Acaulimalva alismatifolia (K.Schum. & Hieron.) Krapov.
 Acaulimalva betonicifolia (A.W.Hill) Krapov.
 Acaulimalva crenata (A.W.Hill) Krapov.
 Acaulimalva dryadifolia (Solms) Krapov.
 Acaulimalva engleriana (Ulbr.) Krapov.
 Acaulimalva glandulifera Krapov.
 Acaulimalva hillii Krapov.
 Acaulimalva nubigena (Walp.) Krapov.
 Acaulimalva oriastrum (Wedd.) Krapov.
 Acaulimalva parnassiifolia (Hook.) Krapov.
 Acaulimalva pazensis Krapov.
 Acaulimalva purdiaei (A.Gray) Krapov.
 Acaulimalva purpurea (A.W.Hill) Krapov.
 Acaulimalva rauhii (Hochr.) Krapov.
 Acaulimalva rhizantha (A.Gray) Krapov.
 Acaulimalva richii (A.Gray) Krapov.
 Acaulimalva steinbachii Krapov.
 Acaulimalva stuebelii (Hieron.) Krapov.
 Acaulimalva sulphurea Krapov.
 Acaulimalva weberbaueri (Ulbr.) Krapov.

References

Malvaceae genera
Malveae